Igado, sometimes also spelled higado, is a Filipino spiced pork liver dish originating from the Ilocos Region of Northern Luzon in the Philippines. Other parts of the pig, including innards and tenderloin, are usually also included, although the liver is considered the defining ingredient of the dish. The pork liver are sliced into tiny pieces and are then usually simmered with potatoes, carrots, bell pepper, green peas, producing a dish often likened to the Tagalog Menudo.  The dish is known to have been a particular favorite of Elpidio Quirino, the Ilocano second president of the Third Philippine Republic.

References

External links

Philippine cuisine
Ilocano cuisine